Summit High School is a public high school located in Bend, Oregon, United States.

History
Summit High School was the third traditional high school built in Bend, with construction completed in 2001. It joined Mountain View High School, which opened in 1979, Bend High School, which opened in 1904, and Marshall High School, a magnet high school also located in Bend.

Demographics
As of the 2014-15 school year, the school had an enrollment of 1,526 students and 56.92 classroom teachers (on an FTE basis), for a student–teacher ratio of 27.3:1. There were 297 students (19.6% of enrollment) eligible for free lunch and 45 (3.0% of students) eligible for reduced-cost lunch.

In September 2007, the freshman class had about 320 students, a significant increase over the school's other classes, which had fewer than 300 each. The school hired more teachers to keep the numbers of students in each classroom below 30.

Academics
In 2008, 86% of the school's seniors received a high school diploma. Of 319 students, 273 graduated, 39 dropped out, four received a modified diploma, and three remained in high school in 2009.

Site
Summit High School is located on a  site that includes  of solid ground amid an area which had been mined for pumice since the 1940s (by 1998 the mining had stopped and the land was sold). Another  over a former pumice mine were later bought for athletic fields. Rather than renovate the land so that it would remain stable, the school district decided to fix any problems as they arose. Construction was finished on the campus in 2001, with a total cost of $29.3 million. After a December 2005 storm, the athletic field became riddled with sinkholes, requiring expensive fixes before it was again usable. Additional storm damage occurred in classrooms, the gym, parking lots, and the theater. At the start of the 08-09 year, Summit had finished its new field and turf stadium due in large part to a grant provided by Drew Bledsoe, ex NFL Quarterback and current Offensive Coordinator for the Storm football team.

Solar power
The school installed a 32-panel solar power system in November 2004 that was projected to provide 7,315 kilowatt-hours (kWh) of electricity. The project was funded through a grant from the Energy Trust of Oregon.

Mascot
Summit's mascot has changed significantly throughout the high school's brief history. In the school's opening ceremony in 2001, Storm Man was revealed as a Batman look-alike with a large "S" emblazoned on his chest, a lightning bolt in one hand, and a shield in the other. In late 2003, the school changed its mascot to a Thundercat. The official team name is the Storm.

Sports
When Summit High School opened its doors in 2001, it joined the Intermountain Conference as an Oregon School Activities Association 4A classification school. In 2006-07, the OSAA changed from a four-tier (1A-4A) classification system to a six-tier (1A-6A); as part of that reclassification, Summit High School remained in the Intermountain Conference but was then classified as 5A. It has remained a 5A school until the 2018-19 school year where it became part of the 6A classification. It is now part of the Mountain Valley conference with Bend and Mountain View High-school, along with multiple schools from the Salem area. Their neighbors and rival high schools, Mountain View and Bend, are also part of the same conference and classification. From school year 2007-2008 through 2017, Summit has averaged more than six state titles every year in the field of athletics. They have won 17 track and field state championships.

State titles 
 Cross country running (men): 2011, 2012, 2013, 2014, 2015
 Cross country running (women): 2008, 2009, 2010, 2011, 2012, 2013, 2014, 2015, 2016, 2017, 2018, 2019
 Cross country skiing (men): 2005, 2006, 2007, 2008, 2009, 2010, 2011, 2012, 2013, 2014, 2016
 Football: 2015
Golf (men): 2015, 2016, 2017
 Golf (women): 2006, 2007, 2009, 2010, 2011, 2012, 2013, 2014, 2015, 2016
 Soccer (men): 2013, 2021
 Soccer (women): 2010, 2012, 2013, 2014, 2015, 2016, 2017
 Swimming (men): 2003, 2004, 2005, 2008, 2009, 2010, 2012, 2013, 2014, 2015
 Swimming (women): 2012, 2013, 2014, 2015
 Tennis (men): 2009, 2011, 2012, 2014, 2015, 2016, 2017, 2018
 Tennis (women): 2012
 Track and field (men): 2005, 2011, 2012, 2013, 2017
 Track and field (women): 2007, 2008, 2009, 2010, 2011, 2012, 2013, 2014, 2015, 2016, 2017, 2018
 Volleyball: 2011, 2015
 Water polo (men): 2014 
 Water polo (women): 2015

Music

Summit High School has had a strong music department in its brief history. Under the direction of award-winning band director Dan Judd, the Summit High School Wind Ensemble performed at the Oregon State Band Championships for the first time in the school's history in 2007, receiving sixth place. The band has continued to perform at the championships every year since 2007, taking first place in the 5A division in 2011, 2012, 2013, 2015, 2016, 2017, and 2018. The band has also received numerous awards at national band festivals in locations including Los Angeles, San Francisco, New York City, and Seattle, and was selected from among hundreds of applicants to perform at Carnegie Hall in New York City in 2011. The Summit High School Symphony Orchestra, a collaboration between the school's band and orchestra programs, competed at the State Championships in 2010 and 2018. In the spring of 2014 the Chorale Choir was invited to perform at the State Championships, where it received eighth place. The Chorale, along with the Skyliner Jazz Ensemble, won the choral division of a national heritage festival held in Anaheim, California.

Oregonian Cup
The Oregonian Cup, sponsored by Oregon's largest newspaper, The Oregonian, is a yearly award that recognizes overall school excellence in academics, activities, athletics and sportsmanship. It seeks to recognize the top school in each OSAA classification based on its overall performance in each of those four key areas.  Summit has won the cup six times since the school opened. School years ending: 2009, 2012, 2014, 2015, 2016 and 2017.

References

High schools in Deschutes County, Oregon
Educational institutions established in 2001
Education in Bend, Oregon
Public high schools in Oregon
2001 establishments in Oregon